Kang Ho-dong (born June 11, 1970) is a South Korean television host and comedian, who first became known to Koreans as one of the top Korean traditional wrestlers.

In 2008, Kang Ho Dong became the first comedian in history to win the Baeksang Arts Awards Daesang (Grand Prize) for Television category. This made him the first in history to achieve an entertainment awards Daesang grand slam, including KBS, MBC, SBS and Baeksang.

Along with comedian Yoo Jae-suk, he has terminated his contract with De Chocolate E&TF (a.k.a. Stom E&F) for issues of non-payment. On September 9, 2011, Kang announced that he would be taking a temporary leave of absence from the public eye due to rumors of tax evasion (which were later found to be caused by mistake by one of his agency's accountants)  He announced his return to the entertainment industry in late 2012 with S.M. C&C as Kang's new agency.

Personal life
Kang Ho-dong was born in Jinju on June 11, 1970 to a family of one brother and three sisters. Kang Ho-dong first met his wife on arranged double blind date with Yoo Jae-suk and on November 12, 2006, Kang married Lee Hyo-jin. They had their first child, a boy named Kang Si-hoo, on March 13, 2009.

Career 
Kang Ho-dong graduated from Masan Business High School. After graduating from high school, he started participating actively in professional Ssireum (Korean wrestling) matches.  Early in his wrestling career, he lost many matches. However, on July 8, 1989, at the 44th national ssireum championships, the unseeded Kang managed to defeat the legendary Lee Mangi and went on to win the tournament, which marked the start of his successful Ssireum career. Known as 'Devil on the sand' for his arrogant and fearless demeanor, he went on to win the Baekdujangsa Ssireum Championship seven times and the Cheonhajangsa Ssireum Championship five times. He was widely recognized as the youngest ever Cheonhajangsa title holder.

After Kang retired from wrestling, he began his MC and comedian career in 1993, appearing on MBC as a talent. He was influenced by Lee Kyung-kyu, who is a famous MC and comedian in South Korea. He later became the host of a number of popular variety programs such as X-Man, Love Letter and Ya Shim Man Man.  Kang has won numerous entertainment awards, and is widely recognized as one of the best television hosts in Korean television history. In 2011, he hosted four popular variety programs – Happy Sunday - 2 Days & 1 Night, Golden Fishery, Star King and Strong Heart.

In 2008, the 44th Baeksang Arts Awards, Kang Ho Dong became the first in history to win the TV category Daesang (Grand Prize) as a comedian. The Daesang had only been awarded to TV actors/actresses ever since its establishment and Kang is the first one to break this tradition.

On September 9, 2011, Kang held a press conference announcing his retirement from the entertainment industry due to his tax evasion controversy and demand for investigation by the National Tax Service.
Kang Ho Dong was investigated for tax evasion. He was initially laid with a fine due to a discrepancy in his numbers, but it seems that there were no formal charges or processes made against the multi-entertainer. On December 17, the Seoul District Prosecutor Office announced, "In the case of the fine being less than $500,000 USD (per year), the National Tax Service must file a charge of tax evasion in order for the subject to be a suspect of tax evasion. However, there has been no such charge up until now, so we have decided to drop the case as of the 16th." Kang Ho Dong's fine amounts to $700,000 USD for a combined three years, significantly less than the required $500,000 USD per year. The National Tax Service added, "Kang Ho Dong's annual fine is less than the required $500,000 USD. Furthermore, he did not commit acts of intentional evasion. It is merely a mistake made on behalf of his accountant, so we will not be charging him with tax evasion.

On August 17, 2012, Kang signed an exclusive contract with SM C&C. CEO Lee Soo-man convinced Kang personally when he was retired along with fellow MC Shin Dong-yup SM Entertainment and made a comeback.

Kang had a rough time after his return to the industry. Multiple programs in three main public broadcasts were canceled because of low ratings. However, starting at the end of 2015, Kang hosted a number of new variety shows in cable broadcast including Knowing Bros, Let's Eat Dinner Together in JTBC and New Journey to the West series in tvN. All of these programs have received very good feedback and high ratings. Thanks to the popularity of the program New Journey to the west, a spin-off program called Kang's Kitchen was launched. As a result, Kang slowly regained his popularity and re-established his status of National MC.

He owns a chain of Korean barbecue restaurants called Baek Jeong.

Notable programs 
 Happy Sunday - 1 Night 2 Days is a wild variety program that airs on Sundays. Six or seven members, originally Kang Ho-dong (main MC), Lee Soo-geun, Eun Ji-won, Kim Jong-min, Ji Sang-ryul and Noh Hong-chul, later members in season 1 were Lee Seung-gi, Kim C, MC Mong, and Uhm Tae-woong, go on a trip for 1 night and 2 days and they play games (Bok-bul-bok) and present the beautiful scenery of South Korea to the viewers. Kang won his first Daesang from KBS during the annual KBS Entertainment Awards in 2008 for hosting 2 Days & 1 Night.
 Golden Fishery was a talk show that aired on Wednesdays. Kang Ho-dong played a "knee guru" to whom celebrities presented a current problem and Kang, along with popular comedian Yoo Se-yoon and All Rise Band, tried to come up with a solution.
 Star King is a talent variety program that airs on Saturdays. Each week, there are different challengers who compete for the title "STAR KING" and guests stars are invited to be the judges of the competition.
 Strong Heart was a talk show originally hosted by Kang Ho-dong and Lee Seung-gi. It aired on Tuesdays. Each week, 24 guest stars were invited to share their entertaining or heartwarming stories that are related to the theme assigned and the guest with the most touching story was presented with the "Strong Heart" title.
 Barefooted Friends was a variety and travel show where the hosts visited various countries in Asia, blending in by living like the locals in that specific country. Kang Ho-Dong was permanent host to the end of the show, alongside Yoon Shi-yoon, Yoon Jong-shin, Yoo Se-yoon, Kim Bum-soo, Eunhyuk, Kim Hyun-joong and Uee
 Our Neighborhood Arts and Physical Education or Cool Kiz on the Block is a variety sports show where the members play amateur sports games. When a sport ends, new members join the cast. Only the three permanent members stay, currently Kang Ho-dong (main MC), Jeong Hyeong-don, and Yang Sangguk. The members play against amateur or professional teams, and often fellow stars. At the KBS 2013 entertainment awards, Cool Kiz on the Block received a reward for the best teamwork.
 New Journey to the West is a Korean reality TV series well known for reuniting the original cast and producer from the “golden era” of the KBS2 variety show “1 Night 2 Days, “New Journey to the West,” named after the Chinese legend “Journey to the West,” features a trip undertaken by Korean TV personalities Kang Ho-dong, Lee Soo-geun, Eun Ji-won and Lee Seung-gi for 1st season. The first season of the show garnered an accumulated 50 million views on domestic portals by April 19, 2016.
 New Journey to the West 2  is a sequel series of New Journey to the West starring South Korean comedians Kang Ho-dong, Lee Soo-geun, singer Eun Ji-won and actor Ahn Jae-hyeon replaced Lee Seung-gi due to his attend to serve active military duty. The sequel however was watched more than 211 million times on Tencent (http://v.qq.com) as of Friday, tvN said. It is the shortest time a video has ever taken on the website to break 1 million views, the South Korean cable network said, adding the show has remained No. 1 in the entertainment category since premiering 45 days ago. (reported by 2016-06-04 11:16)

Filmography

Television drama

Television shows

Music
 2005: "Oh! Happy Day" (Christmas carol featuring child actress, Chae Eun)
 2009: "Horror Show" (featured in MC Mong's repackaged album, Humanimal, also featured in the music video)
 2018: "I kicked my luck off" (SM Station, Kang Ho-dong & Hong Jin-young)

Awards and achievements

Ssireum (wrestling)

Entertainment

State honors

Listicles

Notes

References

External links 
 

South Korean television presenters
South Korean comedians
South Korean ssireum practitioners
South Korean male sport wrestlers
South Korean Buddhists
1970 births
Living people
People from Jinju
SM Town
Best Variety Performer Male Paeksang Arts Award (television) winners